José Luis Rodríguez Pittí is a contemporary writer, videoartist and documentary photographer.

He is the author of short stories, poems and essays. Rodríguez Pittí is author of the books Panamá Blues (2010, miniTEXTOS (2008), Sueños urbanos (2008) and Crónica de invisibles (1999). Most of his stories and essays were published in literary magazines and newspapers.

In 1994, the Universidad de Panamá awarded him with the Premio "Darío Herrera". Other literary honors received are Accesit in the Premio Nacional "Signos" 1993 (Panamá), Concurso Nacional de Cuentos "José María Sánchez" 1998 (Panamá), Concurso "Amadís de Gaula" 1999 (Soria, España) and the Concurso "Maga" de Cuento Corto 2001 (Panamá)

Early life and education
Rodríguez Pittí was born in Panama City on 29 March 1971. He grew up in Mexico City, Santiago de Veraguas and Panamá City. He is resident of Toronto, Canada.

Graduated from the Universidad Tecnológica de Panamá, was Computer Vision, Programming Languages and Deep Learning Professor  at the Universidad Tecnológica de Panamá and Universidad Santa María la Antigua.

Biography
President of the Writers Association of Panama from 2008 to 2010. Founder and President of Fundación El Hacedor (since 2007).

From 1990 to 1995 he traveled extensively in the Panamanian region of Azuero to collect stories and photograph, the body of three photo essays: "Viernes Santo en Pesé", "Cuadernos de Azuero", and "Noche de carnaval". Other photography essays are "De diablos, diablicos y otros seres de la mitología panameña" and "Regee Child". Some of his photographs are cover art of books published in Panamá. His work has been exhibited in Panamá, México, Canadá and Italy.

Awards and honors 
 1993, Finalista, Premio "Signos" de Joven Literatura 1993 otorgado en Panamá
 1994, Premio "Darío Herrera" de Literatura otorgado por la Universidad de Panamá
1994, Premio Canon "Día de la Tierra"
 1998, Accésit, Premio Nacional de Cuento "José María Sánchez" 1998 otorgado en Panamá
 1999, Accésit, Concurso de Cuento "Amadis de Gaula" otorgado en Soria (España)

Works

Fiction
 Crónica de invisibles (1999) 
 Sueños urbanos (2008, 2010) 
 Panamá Blues (2010)

Machine learning
 Fundamentos de Redes Neuronales (1994, 2010) - Introduction to Artificial Neural Networks
 Visión de Máquina (1994, 2010) - Computer Vision

Anthologies
 Hasta el sol de mañana (Ed. E. Jaramillo Levi). Fundación Signos, Panamá, 1998. 
 Panamá cuenta (Ed. E. Jaramillo Levi). Editorial Norma, Panamá, 2003. 
 La minificción en Panamá (Ed. E. Jaramillo Levi). Universidad Pedagógica Nacional, Bogotá, Colombia, 2003. 
 Sueño compartido (Ed. E. Jaramillo Levi). Universal Books, Panamá, 2005. 
 Cuento que te quiero cuento (Ed. F. Morales de Castillo). 9Signos, Panamá, 2007. 
 miniTEXTOS (Ed. JL Rodríguez Pittí). Flash fiction anthology. El Hacedor, Panamá, 2010.
 Mundo 21 (Ed. Samaniego; Rodríguez; De Alarcón). Boston: Cengage Learning, 2010. 
 Con solo tu nombre y un poco de silencio (Poetry) (Ed. Héctor Collado). Panamá: Editorial Tecnológica, 2012. 
 Tiempo al tiempo. Nuevos cuentistas de Panamá: 1990-2012. (Short-stories) (Ed. E. Jaramillo Levi). Panamá: Universal Books, 2012. 
 Mensajes 12 (Antología literaria) (Ed. A. Barría Alvarado). Panamá: Editorial Santillana, 2012.
 MICROLAT. Antología de microficciones latinoamericanas (Editor: Sergio Gaut vel Hartman). México, D.F.: Universidad Autónoma de México, 2016.
 Aquí hay dragones (Ed. Alberto Sánchez Argüello). Managua, Nicaragua: Parafernalia Ediciones, 2016.
 Latinoamérica en breve (Ed. Sergio Gaut vel Hartman). México, D.F.: Universidad Autónoma Metropolitana Xochimilco, 2016. 
 Tierra breve. Antología centroamericana de minificción (Ed. Federico Hernández). San Salvador, El Salvador: Índole Editores, 2017. 
 Aquí hay dragones (Editor: Alberto Sánchez Argüello). Gainesville, FL, EEUU: La Pereza Ediciones, 2020. 
 Historias mínimas (Ed. Franz Gutierrez). Lima, Perú: Dendro Ediciones. 2020. 
 Minimundos (Ed. Eliana Soza Martínez y Karla Barajas). Lima, Perú: Dendro Editores, 2021.
 Latinoamérica cuenta (Ed. Renato Sandoval Bacigalupo). Bogotá, Colombia: Editorial Tragaluz, 2021.

References

External links
miniTEXTOS.org – Very short stories, poems and essays, presented by the author (in Spanish).
Piel de tigre – Short stories, essays and photographs by the author (in Spanish).
Portfolio – Photographic portfolio by Jose Luis Rodriguez Pitti.
Noticias: literatura en Panamá – Weekly newsletter from the Asociación de Escritores de Panamá (in Spanish).
El Hacedor – Literary foundation created by the author, responsible of the Arts and Literature Festival at Veraguas (in Spanish).
Jose Luis Rodriguez Pitti – Information about the author in the database maintained by the Universidad Tecnológica de Panamá (in Spanish).
la hoja – Radio program about the author (in Spanish).
Hacia una literatura de las muchas culturas – Essay about the contemporary literature in Panamá (in Spanish).
A 468 años del primer cuento "panameño" – Essay about the history of the short-story genre in Panamá (in Spanish).
ZoneZero – Photographic portfolio by the author.
Guatemala Times – Guatemala Book Fair and The Writers Meeting.

1971 births
Living people
Panamanian poets
Male poets
Panamanian essayists
Male essayists
Panamanian photographers
Panamanian short story writers
Male short story writers
Panamanian male writers
Panamanian novelists
Male novelists
Contemporary artists
People from Panama City
Computer systems engineers
Postmodern writers
Mexican video artists
Book artists
Documentary photographers
21st-century Canadian short story writers
21st-century Canadian male writers
Canadian male poets
Canadian male short story writers
Canadian people of Panamanian descent
Technological University of Panama alumni